Lloyd Harrison (born June 21, 1977) is a former American football cornerback in the National Football League for the Washington Redskins, the San Diego Chargers, and the Miami Dolphins. He was drafted in the third round of the 2000 NFL Draft. He played college football at North Carolina State University.

Early Life
Harrison grew up in the East Flatbush section of Brooklyn before he moved with his family to Long Island. He attended P.S. 208 elementary school, Meyer Levin JHS and Lafayette HS in Brooklyn.
In Long Island he attended Sewanhaka Central HS in Floral Park NY

College career
Harrison attended North Carolina State University and was a letterman in football and track.  In track, Harrison was a member of NC State’s conference championship 4X100 relay team in 1996.  In football, he was a three-year starter at cornerback and finished his collegiate career with 190 tackles (nine for loss), 12 interceptions, 40 passes defensed, one sack, two fumble recoveries, five forced fumble, and four blocked kicks.  He was a semifinalist for the Jim Thorpe Award, given to the top defensive back in the nation and was a two-time All-American second-team and two-time All-Atlantic Coast Conference first-team selection.  He was drafted in the 2000 NFL Draft by the Washington Redskins.

1998 - Associated Press (2nd), Football News (2nd)l 1999 - Associated Press (3rd), CBS Sportsline (2nd)
Lloyd Harrison led the ACC in interceptions and passes broken up as a junior in 1998, tallying seven picks and 23 PBUs. The 5-11, 190 pound cornerback from Floral Park, N.Y., was also named a preseason All-American for 1999 by Playboy. Finished his career ranked third in school history with 12 interceptions, third in passes broken up with 40.

References

1977 births
Living people
American football cornerbacks
NC State Wolfpack football players
Washington Redskins players
San Diego Chargers players
Miami Dolphins players